Nichomachus was a playwright who lived in Athens in the 5th century BC.  He was a younger contemporary of Sophocles.  Only the following titles and associated fragments of Nichomachus's plays have survived: Alcmaeon, Aletides, Alexander, Geryones, Eriphyle, Mysians, Neoptolemus, Polyxena, Teucer, and Tyndareos.  He also wrote a play titled Oedipus.

References

Ancient Greek dramatists and playwrights
Tragic poets
5th-century BC Athenians